Gholam Hosein Shiri Aliabad (30 April 1961 – 3 August 2021) was an Iranian politician.

Biography

Shiri Aliabad was born in Hashtrud, East Azerbaijan. He was a member of the 2012 Iranian legislative election Islamic Consultative Assembly from the electorate of Hashtrud and Charuymaq, and member of Iran-Turkey Friendship society. Shiri Aliabad won with 25,775 (50.36%) votes.

Aliabhad died from COVID-19 in August 2021.

References

1961 births
2021 deaths
People from East Azerbaijan Province
Deputies of Hashtrud and Charuymaq
Iranian economists
Tarbiat Modares University alumni
Members of the 9th Islamic Consultative Assembly
Deaths from the COVID-19 pandemic in Iran